Amblada is a genus of small flies of the family Lauxaniidae. It contains only one species, Amblada atomaria.

Distribution
Philippines, Sulawesi.

References

Lauxaniidae
Diptera of Asia